Fábio Luís Ramim (born 10 April 1981 in São Paulo, Brazil) is a naturalized Azerbaijani football midfielder, who plays for Rio Preto.

Career

Club
In February 2005, Fabio signed for MKT Araz in the Azerbaijan Top League, a move that three years later, after moving to Olimpik Baku in the winter of 2006, saw him take Azerbaijani citizenship and choose to represent Azerbaijan internationally. Fabio moved to Baku in the summer of 2008 before leaving in the winter of the 2011–12 season.

International career
After moving to Azerbaijan in 2005, Fabio took Azerbaijani citizenship making him eligible to play for Azerbaijan. Fabio made his debut in a friendly against Bosnia and Herzegovina, on 1 June 2008, and went on to make 16 appearances, scoring 4 goals.

Career statistics

Club

International

Statistics accurate as of 10 August 2011

International goals

Honours

Club
FK Baku
Azerbaijan Premier League: (1) 2008–09
Azerbaijan Cup: (2) 2009–10, 2011–12

References

External links

Profile at CBF 

1981 births
Living people
Footballers from São Paulo
Naturalized citizens of Azerbaijan
Azerbaijani footballers
Azerbaijan international footballers
Azerbaijani expatriate footballers
Association football midfielders
Brazilian emigrants to Azerbaijan
Brazilian footballers
Azerbaijan Premier League players
Clube Atlético Linense players
AZAL PFK players
FC Baku players
FK MKT Araz players